

Portugal
 Angola – 
 Temporarily vacant (1732–1733)
 Rodrigo César de Meneses, Governor of Angola (1733–1738)
 Macau – Antonio de Amaral Meneses, Governor of Macau (1732–1735)

Colonial governors
Colonial governors
1733